Sveti Filip i Jakov is a municipality in Croatia in Zadar County. It has a total population of 4,606, in the following settlements:
 Donje Raštane, population 499
 Gornje Raštane, population 456
 Sikovo, population 374
 Sveti Filip i Jakov, population 1667
 Sveti Petar na Moru, population 403
 Turanj, population 1207

At the time of the 2011 census, 98% of the inhabitants were Croats.

The municipality's Church of Saint Roch is classified by the Croatian government as a tourist locality.

References

External links

 Official Website

Municipalities of Croatia
Populated places in Zadar County